Geneva Township is one of twelve townships in Allen County, Kansas, United States. As of the 2010 census, its population was 119.

Geography

According to the USGS, it contains two cemeteries: Carpenter and Geneva.

The streams of Greaser Creek, Indian Creek, Liberty Creek, Martin Creek and Rock Creek run through this township.

References

External links
 City-Data.com
 Allen County Maps: Current, Historic, KDOT

Townships in Allen County, Kansas
Townships in Kansas